The year 1883 in science and technology involved some significant events, listed below.

Chemistry
 Svante Arrhenius develops ion theory to explain conductivity in electrolytes.
 The Claus process is first patented by German chemist Carl Friedrich Claus.
 The Schotten–Baumann reaction is first described by chemists Carl Schotten and Eugen Baumann.

Earth sciences
 August 26 – Krakatoa begins its final phase of eruptions at 1:06pm local time. These produce a number of tsunami, mainly in the early hours of the next day, which result in about 36,000 deaths on the islands of Sumatra and Java. The final explosion at 10:02am on August 27 destroys the island of Krakatoa itself and is heard up to 3000 miles away.
 Vasily Dokuchaev publishes Russian Chernozem.

Genetics
 The concept and term Eugenics are formulated by Francis Galton.

Medicine
 German psychiatrist Karl Ludwig Kahlbaum identifies a disorder characterized by recurring mood cycles which he and his student Ewald Hecker name cyclothymia.
 Thomas Clouston publishes Clinical Lectures on Mental Diseases.
 Emil Kraepelin publishes Compendium der Psychiatrie.
 Journal of the American Medical Association first published under this title.

Microbiology
 Robert Koch isolates Vibrio cholerae, the cholera bacillus.

Physics
 Osborne Reynolds popularizes use of the Reynolds number in fluid mechanics.

Technology
 May 24 – Brooklyn Bridge opens to traffic in New York.
 Charles Fritts constructs the first solar cell using the semiconductor selenium on a thin layer of gold to form a device giving less than 1% efficiency.

Zoology
 August 12 – The last quagga dies at the Artis Magistra zoo in Amsterdam.

Awards
 Copley Medal: William Thomson, Lord Kelvin
 Wollaston Medal for Geology: William Thomas Blanford

Births
 January 4 – Johanna Westerdijk (died 1961), Dutch plant pathologist.
 February 10 – Edith Clarke (died 1959), American electrical engineer, inducted into the National Inventors Hall of Fame.
 March 4 – Julius Fromm (died 1945), German businessman, inventor known for the Condom machine 
 May 5 – Anna Johnson Pell Wheeler (died 1966), American mathematician.
 May 13 – Georgios Papanikolaou (died 1962), Greek-born cytopathologist, inventor of the Pap smear.
 June 24 – Victor Francis Hess (died 1964), American physicist.
 July 15 – Orii Hyōjirō (died 1970), Japanese animal specimen collector.
 August 6 – Constance Georgina Adams (died 1968), South African botanist.
 October 2 – Karl von Terzaghi (died 1963), Austrian "father of soil mechanics".
 October 8 – Otto Heinrich Warburg (died 1970), German physiologist, winner of the 1931 Nobel Prize in Physiology or Medicine.

Deaths
 January 23 – George Miller Beard (born 1839), American neurologist.
 April 10 - Maurice Krishaber (born 1836), naturalised French Hungarian otorhinolaryngologist.
 April 14 – William Farr (born 1807), English epidemiologist.
 April 28 – Rev. John Russell (born 1795), English dog breeder.
 May 13 – James Young (born 1811), Scottish chemist.
 June 18 – John Waterston (born 1811), Scottish physicist and civil engineer (drowned).
 June 26 – General Sir Edward Sabine (born 1788), Anglo-Irish physicist, astronomer and explorer.
 September 15 – Joseph Plateau (born 1801), Belgian physicist.
 December 8 – François Lenormant (born 1837), French assyriologist and numismatist.
 December 13 – John Stringfellow (born 1799), English pioneer of heavier-than-air flight.

References

 
19th century in science
1880s in science